Gaoyao, alternately romanized as Koyiu, is an urban district of Zhaoqing in western Guangdong, China. Population: 706,000.

Name
Gaoyao—literally "high-&-wanting"—is a former name of the Lingyang Gorge on the Xi River. It was originally the name of the surrounding land but came to be used for the area's seat of government. Gaoyao is the pinyin romanization of the Chinese name, based on its Mandarin pronunciation; the former Chinese Postal Map spelling was based on the local Cantonese pronunciation of the same name. Gaoyao has also sometimes been romanized as KaouYaou.

Geography
Gaoyao is located on the southern bank of the Xi River, opposite central Zhaoqing.

Climate

History
Gaoyao was a county of the Qin and Han and its eponymous county seat was the principal settlement of the area. Under the Sui, the administration relocated across the river to Duanzhou, which was renamed Zhaoqing under the Song. Gaoyao continued as a separate county in Zhaoqing Commandery. It was promoted to a county-level city in 1993 and later to urban district status.

Tourism
Places of interest include the Red Mansion and Gaoyao Xuegong Pavilion. There are also 3 pagodas that can be seen in Gaoyao.

Image gallery

Administrative divisions
Gaoyao has jurisdiction over one subdistrict and several towns:

Miscellaneous
 Gaoyao is closely connected with the Duanzhou District of Zhaoqing City, geographically as well as culturally. The two urban districts are connected by two road bridges and a railway bridge.
 Gaoyao is also a known hometown for many Overseas Chinese. There is a large community from Gaoyao in Sydney, Australia.

some notable figures:

 Liang Han Chao (梁寒操): historian, educator, and also founder of Kwangtung cultural and history periodical.

 Herbert Chow Ciu Lung (周小龍): founder of chickeeduck clothing, also a Hong Kong social activist.

 Joshua Wong Chi-fung (黃之鋒): Hong Kong male politician

 Fong Lai Ying (方麗盈): Hong Kong experienced female singer

References

Citations

Bibliography
 , reprinted 2000.

External links

 http://www.gaoyao.gov.cn 

 
County-level divisions of Guangdong
Zhaoqing